The Broadcast is an Americana/aoul band from Asheville, North Carolina composed of Caitlin Krisko (vocals), Aaron Austin (guitar), Mike Runyon (keys), William Seymour (bass), Tyler Housholder (percussion), and Michael W. Davis (drums). Their independently released debut, Dodge The Arrow, was recorded in 2013 at Echo Mountain Studio with LA producer Eric “Mixerman” Sarafin.  It went on to sell over 15,000 copies, ranked as high as #4 on the college radio charts, and earned them “Best New Artist” and runner up for “Album of the Year” from Homegrown Music Network.  Their sophomore full-length album, From The Horizon, is due out June 17, 2016. David Dye and Joe Kendrick premiered "On The Edge", the first single from the new album on World Cafe's Sense of Place on March 31, 2016.

The band's music eventually caught the ear of producer Jim Scott (Tedeschi Trucks Band, Wilco, Grace Potter, Tom Petty, Rolling Stones, Red Hot Chili Peppers).  The seven-time Grammy-winner invited the band to travel to Los Angeles after hearing the demos the band had recorded.  There, band members recorded their second album, From the Horizon, in the desert of California. 

In 2018, The Broadcast recorded their 3rd studio album, produced by Tim Lefebvre (David Bowie, Tedeschi Trucks Band) and Tyler "Falcon" Greenwell (Tedeschi Trucks Band, Col. Bruce Hampton) with a release date of spring 2020. 

The Broadcast has performed on stages with Mavis Staples, John Prine, St. Paul & The Broken Bones, The Wood Brothers, Brandi Carlile, Keller Williams, Nicki Bluhm and The Gramblers, George Porter Jr. (Funky Meters), Bettye LaVette, Charles Bradley and Holly Williams, among others.

External links 
 http://thebroadcastmusic.com

References 

American soul musical groups